War on a String is a 2015 Chinese suspense crime action film directed by Li Kai. It was released on May 8, 2015 in China.

Cast
Vincent Chiao
Andrew Lin
Lin Jinfeng
Han Qiuchi
Qi Yunpeng
Peng Bo
Gao Fei
Hu Shuangquan

Reception
By May 8, 2015, the film had grossed  at the Chinese box office.

References

2015 crime action films
Chinese crime action films
Chinese suspense films